Poulton is a settlement in Cheshire West and Chester. The area, which was a former civil parish until being merged into the combined parish of Poulton and Pulford in 2015, 
is in the ceremonial county of Cheshire in England. In 2001 census it had a recorded population of 92.

Since 1995, significant archaeological activity has been conducted in the area, first by the University of Liverpool and later by the independent group known as the Poulton Research Project.

History
Archaeological research has established there has been human habitation in the area since the Mesolithic period (8,000 B.C.). In the Sub-Roman Britain period, Iron Age roundhouse ditches, Briquetage and animal bones have also been found suggesting the area was once an important site for the processing and preserving of meat for trading. Roman finds include ditches, domestic ceramics and building materials relating to the Legio XX Valeria Victrix that was garrisoned at the nearby legionary fortress of Deva Victrix (Chester).

During the medieval period, Poulton Chapel was an important monastic site that was founded by the Cistercian monks of Poulton Abbey in the mid 12th century. Although it is believed to have been a substantial site, only a small amount of ground level masonry survives.

Until 1919 the village was part of the Grosvenor Estate administered from nearby Eaton Hall. Several of the buildings in the former parish were commissed by Hugh Grosvenor, 1st Duke of Westminster, and designed by Douglas and Fordham, a well-known Cheshire architects' practice.

In 1870–72, John Marius Wilson described the settlement in the Imperial Gazetteer of England and Wales as:
POULTON, a township in Pulford parish, Cheshire; on an affluent of the river Dee, 4¼ miles S of Chester. Acres, 1, 391. Real property, £1, 723. Pop., 132. Houses, 22. A Cistertian abbey was founded here, in 1153, by Robert Pincerna; and was removed, in 1220, to Dieulacres in Staffordshire.

During the Second World War, the RAF established RAF Poulton to the northwest of the settlement. The base was used to train pilots flying Hawker Hurricanes. Much of wartime airfield's runway, perimeter track, and aircraft hardstandings remain.

See also

Listed buildings in Poulton, Cheshire

References

Further reading

External links

Villages in Cheshire
Former civil parishes in Cheshire
Cheshire West and Chester